Maramie County is one of the counties of Queensland, Australia, that existed before 1901.
 The county is divided into civil  parishes.

References

Maramie